Mark Rawlinson (born 9 June 1975) is a police officer and former English footballer who played in The Football League for Bournemouth and Exeter City.

Career
Rawlinson started his career at Manchester United before leaving in 1995 to join Bournemouth where he spent five years. He then joined Exeter City before dropping into non-league football with Weymouth, Dorchester Town and FC United of Manchester.

References

English footballers
AFC Bournemouth players
Exeter City F.C. players
Weymouth F.C. players
Dorchester Town F.C. players
F.C. United of Manchester players
English Football League players
1975 births
Living people
Association football midfielders